Eduardo C. Lim (October 13, 1930 – March 25, 2002), also known as Eddie Lim, is a former basketball player like fellow San Beda Red Lions and Hall of Famers Carlos Loyzaga and Antonio Genato. He was a guard who earned the moniker "Stonewall" from sportscaster Willie Hernandez. He sparked San Beda to the NCAA championships in 1951-52 and the National Open tournament, also in 1952. In the Manila Industrial and Commercial Athletic Association, Lim played a key role for multi-titled YCO that won the National Open crown a record seven straight times under coaches Leo Prieto and the late Tito Eduque.

Lim, a two-time Olympian, played on two Asian Games gold medal teams in 1954 and 1958. He saw action for the Philippine selection that finished ninth at the 1959 FIBA World Championship in Chile. A hard-nosed guard, Lim led San Beda to back-to-back NCAA titles as a collegian. After retiring, Lim  became a successful businessman, chairman of the Makati Stock Exchange, and since 1995, chairman emeritus of the Philippine Stock Exchange.

References

External links
 

1930 births
2002 deaths
Olympic basketball players of the Philippines
Basketball players at the 1952 Summer Olympics
Basketball players at the 1956 Summer Olympics
Asian Games medalists in basketball
Sportspeople from Iloilo City
Basketball players from Iloilo
San Beda Red Lions basketball players
Basketball players at the 1954 Asian Games
Basketball players at the 1958 Asian Games
Philippines men's national basketball team players
Filipino men's basketball players
1959 FIBA World Championship players
Guards (basketball)
Asian Games gold medalists for the Philippines
Medalists at the 1954 Asian Games
Medalists at the 1958 Asian Games